Kip is the given name of:

People
 Kip Carpenter (born 1979), American speed skater
 Kip Corrington (born 1965), American collegiate football and National Football League player
 Kip Diggs (born 1966), American politician and retired professional boxer
 Kip Gamblin (born 1975), Australian ballet dancer and actor
 Kip Gross (born 1964), former Major League Baseball and Nippon Professional Baseball pitcher
 Kip Hanrahan (born 1954), American jazz music impresario, record producer and percussionist
 Kip Janvrin (born 1965), American former decathlete
 Kip Kinkel (born 1982), American teenage spree killer
 Kip Miller (born 1969), American National Hockey League player
 Kip Moore (born 1980), American country music singer/songwriter
 Kip Thorne (born 1940), American theoretical physicist
 Kip Tokuda (1946–2013), American social worker and politician
 Kip Williams (born 1987), Australian director and Artistic Director of Sydney Theatre Company
 Kip Winger (born 1961), American musician
 Kip Young (born 1954), American former Major League Baseball pitcher

Fictional characters
 Kip Half-Sack Epps, on the FX television series Sons of Anarchy
 Kipling "Kip" Ronald Dynamite, from the 2004 movie Napoleon Dynamite
 Kip Supernova, from the animated film Escape from Planet Earth
 Kip "Buffy" Wilson, from the TV show Bosom Buddies 
 Kip, from the children's television series Higglytown Heroes
 Kip O'Donnell, a poacher and villain in The Wild Thornberries
 Kip O'Drordy, a lonesome and outcast kid in South Park
 Kip, a Fastball in The Warriors

English-language masculine given names